San Rafael del Sur is a town and a municipality in the Managua department of Nicaragua.

International relations

Twin towns – Sister cities
Granada is twinned with:

Some towns in San Rafael del Sur are:

-El Salto.
-Los Gutierrez norte.
-Los Gutierrez sur.
-Los Sanchez norte.
-Los Sanchez sur.
-San Pablo.
-Los Velasquez.

References 

Municipalities of the Managua Department